Jason Frederick Carroll is an American journalist who is a national correspondent for CNN, a cable-news television channel.

Early life and education

Carroll was born in Westlake Village, California. He graduated with a Bachelor of Arts degree in literature and creative writing from the University of Southern California, located in Los Angeles, California.

Career
Carroll was scouted as a model after high school. His broadcast career started as an on-air intern at KGET-TV in Bakersfield, California. He also interned for 60 Minutes. He worked for CBS2 in Los Angeles before moving to CNN New York.
Since joining CNN he has covered breaking-news stories including the earthquake in Haiti, following soldiers into war in Afghanistan, numerous Hurricanes including Hurricane Katrina, and Hurricane Sandy.

Awards
Carroll is a recipient of numerous awards including an Edward R. Murrow Award.

See also

List of CNN anchors (includes list of correspondents)
List of television reporters
List of University of Southern California people

References

Year of birth missing (living people)
Place of birth missing (living people)
20th-century American non-fiction writers
21st-century American non-fiction writers
African-American journalists
African-American television personalities
American television reporters and correspondents
CNN people
Journalists from California
Kansas television personalities
Living people
University of Southern California alumni
Writers from Los Angeles
People from Westlake Village, California
20th-century African-American writers
21st-century African-American writers